Ray O'Rourke may refer to:

Ray O'Rourke (footballer) (born 1948), Australian football player
Ray O'Rourke (businessman) (born 1947), Irish businessman, chairman and CEO of Laing O'Rourke